The Men's points race was held on 19 October 2012. 25 riders participated, the heat distance was  – or 80 laps – with a sprint every 10 laps for extra points and the final distance was  – or 160 laps. A lap gained 20 points.

Medalists

Results

Heats
The 10 best riders advanced to the final. The races were held at 14:55.

Heat 1

Heat 2

Final
The race was held at 21:13.

References

Men's points race
European Track Championships – Men's points race